Aspasia (minor planet designation: 409 Aspasia) is a large main-belt asteroid that was discovered by French astronomer Auguste Charlois on 9 December 1895 in Nice. It is classified as a CX-type asteroid.

Photometric observations of this asteroid at the Palmer Divide Observatory in Colorado Springs, Colorado, during 2007–8 gave a light curve with a period of 9.021455 ± 0.000009 hours. This is consistent with previous results.

References

External links 
 Lightcurve plot of 409 Aspasia, Palmer Divide Observatory, B. D. Warner (2008)
 Asteroid Lightcurve Database (LCDB), query form (info )
 Dictionary of Minor Planet Names, Google books
 Asteroids and comets rotation curves, CdR – Observatoire de Genève, Raoul Behrend
 Discovery Circumstances: Numbered Minor Planets (1)-(5000) – Minor Planet Center
 
 

Background asteroids
Aspasia
Aspasia
CX-type asteroids (Tholen)
Xc-type asteroids (SMASS)
18951209